Elena Vladimirovna Arzhakova (born 8 September 1989) is a Russian runner who specializes in the middle distance events.

The 2011 European Indoor champion at 1500m, Arzhakova was suspended from athletics in 2013 following a failed doping control, after an abnormality was found in her biological passport. Her results from July 2011 were expunged, as a result of which she was stripped of her further European outdoor and European under-23 titles. Her suspension ended on 29 January 2015.

Achievements

References

1989 births
Living people
Russian female middle-distance runners
Russian female steeplechase runners
Russian sportspeople in doping cases
Doping cases in athletics
Athletes (track and field) at the 2012 Summer Olympics
Olympic athletes of Russia
Sportspeople from Barnaul
21st-century Russian women